The Journal of Travel Research is a bimonthly peer-reviewed academic journal covering tourism. The editor-in-chief is Geoffrey I. Crouch (La Trobe University, Australia). It was established in 1968 and is published by SAGE Publications.

Abstracting and indexing 
The journal is abstracted and indexed in Scopus and the Social Sciences Citation Index. According to the Journal Citation Reports, the journal has a 2017 impact factor of 5.169.

References

External links 
 

SAGE Publishing academic journals
English-language journals
Tourism geography
Economics journals
Bimonthly journals
Publications established in 1968